The women's 52 kg competition of the 2011 World Judo Championships was held on August 24.

Medalists

Results

Pool A

Pool B

Pool C

Pool D

Repechage

Finals

References

External links
 
 Draw

W52
World Judo Championships Women's Half Lightweight
World W52